William Pietersz (born 18 February 1925) was a Colombian former sports shooter. He competed in the trap event at the 1956 Summer Olympics.

References

External links
 

1925 births
Possibly living people
Colombian male sport shooters
Olympic shooters of Colombia
Shooters at the 1956 Summer Olympics
20th-century Colombian people